Al Jama-ah is a South African political party. It was formed in 2007 by present leader Ganief Hendricks and contested the 2009, 2014 and 2019 national elections.

The party aims to support Muslim interests and uphold Shari'a law. The flag of Al Jama-ah depicts a white gim (the first letter in its Arabic name), upon a field consisting of the other Islamic colours. In 2023, Al Jama-ah saw the ascension of party member Thapelo Amad to the position of Mayor of Johannesburg.

History
Until 2019, the party had no elected representatives nationally or provincially although it came close in both the 2009 and 2014 elections, and won 9 seats at the local level in the 2016 municipal elections.

It made a breakthrough in 2019, winning its first national representative (becoming the first Islam-affiliated party to do so), as well as one seat in the Western Cape legislature.

In October 2019, its member of parliament for the Western Cape, Izgak De Jager, was replaced by Galil Brinkhuis after De Jager was accused of not complying with an agreement to pay 50% of his gross salary to the party. De Jager in turn stated that the agreement was to pay 50% of the net, not gross salary, and accused the party of failing disclose its debt to its members.

In 2023, Al Jama-ah's Thapelo Amad was chosen as Mayor of Johannesburg with the support of the African National Congress.

Election results

National Assembly

|-
! Election
! Total votes
! Share of vote
! Seats 
! +/–
! Government
|-
! 2009
| 25,947
| 0.15
| 
| –
| 
|-
! 2014
| 25,976
| 0.14
| 
| –
| 
|-
! 2019
| 31,468
| 0.18
| 
| 1
| 
|}

Provincial elections

! rowspan=2 | Election
! colspan=2 | Eastern Cape
! colspan=2 | Free State
! colspan=2 | Gauteng
! colspan=2 | Kwazulu-Natal
! colspan=2 | Limpopo
! colspan=2 | Mpumalanga
! colspan=2 | North-West
! colspan=2 | Northern Cape
! colspan=2 | Western Cape
|-
! % !! Seats
! % !! Seats
! % !! Seats
! % !! Seats
! % !! Seats
! % !! Seats
! % !! Seats
! % !! Seats
! % !! Seats
|-
! 2014
| align=center | – || align=center | –
| align=center | – || align=center | –
| align=center | – || align=center | –
| align=center | – || align=center | –
| align=center | – || align=center | –
| align=center | – || align=center | –
| align=center | – || align=center | –
| align=center | – || align=center | –
| align=center | 0.62% || align=center | 0/42
|-
! 2019
| align=center | 0.15% || align=center | 0/63
| align=center | – || align=center | –
| align=center | 0.18% || align=center | 0/73
| align=center | 0.28% || align=center | 0/80
| align=center | – || align=center | –
| align=center | – || align=center | –
| align=center | – || align=center | –
| align=center | – || align=center | –
| align=center | 0.86% || align=center | 1/42
|}

Municipal elections

In a by-election in November 2020, Al-Jama-ah won a ward in the City of Johannesburg from the Democratic Alliance.

|-
! Election
! Votes
! %
! +/–
|-
! 2011
| 13,227
| 0.04% 
| - 
|-
! 2016
| 36,891
| 0.10% 
| +0.06
|-
! 2021 
| 61,189
| 0.20% 
| +0.10
|-
|}

See also
 Africa Muslim Party

References

External links
Al Jama-ah

2007 establishments in South Africa
Islamic political parties in South Africa
Islamic democratic political parties
Political parties established in 2007